Teresa Ernster van der Stoep (born 10 June 1970) is a Dutch female weightlifter, competing in the 69 kg category and representing Netherlands at international competitions. She competed at world championships, most recently at the 2001 World Weightlifting Championships.
Ernster was a judoka and undertook weightlifting as part of cross-training.

Personal
Teresa is married to Henk van der Stoep, a Greco-Roman wrestler and ten-time Dutch national champion. His sister, Yvonne van der Stoep is also a weightlifter and masters world champion.

Major results

References

External links
 
 
 10th European Championships at IWRP

1970 births
Living people
Dutch female weightlifters
Place of birth missing (living people)
20th-century Dutch women